Iowa County is a county in the U.S. state of Wisconsin. As of the 2020 census, the population was 23,709. Its county seat and largest city is Dodgeville. When created, it was part of the Michigan Territory. Iowa County is part of the Madison, Wisconsin, Metropolitan Statistical Area.

History

The county organized under the Michigan Territory government in 1830. It was named for the Iowa tribe.

Geography
It is drained by tributaries of the Pecatonica River, which has its headwaters in the county. The highest point in the county is West Blue Mound at 1,716 ft. above sea level. The lowest point is the Wisconsin river at the Grant County line at 667 ft. above sea level.

Rivers and streams
 Harker Creek

Major highways

  U.S. Highway 14
  U.S. Highway 18
  U.S. Highway 151
  Highway 23 (Wisconsin)
  Highway 39 (Wisconsin)
  Highway 78 (Wisconsin)
  Highway 80 (Wisconsin)
  Highway 130 (Wisconsin)
  Highway 133 (Wisconsin)
  Highway 191 (Wisconsin)

Railroads
Wisconsin and Southern Railroad

Buses
List of intercity bus stops in Wisconsin

Airport
 Iowa County Airport (KMRJ) serves the county and surrounding communities.

Adjacent counties
 Richland County - northwest
 Sauk County - northeast
 Dane County - east
 Green County - southeast
 Lafayette County - south
 Grant County - west

Demographics

2020 census
As of the census of 2020, the population was 23,709. The racial makeup of the county was 94.2% White, 0.8% Asian, 0.5% Black or African American, 0.2% Native American, 0.1% Pacific Islander, 0.9% from other races, and 3.5% from two or more races. Ethnically, the population was 1.9% Hispanic or Latino of any race.

2000 census

As of the census of 2000, there were 22,780 people, 8,764 households, and 6,213 families residing in the county. The population density was 30 people per square mile (12/km2). There were 9,579 housing units at an average density of 13 per square mile (5/km2). The racial makeup of the county was 98.70% White, 0.17% Black or African American, 0.11% Native American, 0.34% Asian, 0.01% Pacific Islander, 0.11% from other races, and 0.55% from two or more races. 0.33% of the population were Hispanic or Latino of any race. 33.6% were of German, 17.2% Norwegian, 11.6% English, 11.3% Irish and 7.9% American ancestry.

There were 8,764 households, out of which 34.60% had children under the age of 18 living with them, 59.50% were married couples living together, 7.60% had a female householder with no husband present, and 29.10% were non-families. 24.30% of all households were made up of individuals, and 10.10% had someone living alone who was 65 years of age or older. The average household size was 2.56 and the average family size was 3.06.

In the county, the population was spread out, with 27.10% under the age of 18, 6.60% from 18 to 24, 30.40% from 25 to 44, 22.50% from 45 to 64, and 13.30% who were 65 years of age or older. The median age was 37 years. For every 100 females, there were 99.30 males. For every 100 females age 18 and over, there were 97.70 males.

Politics
Iowa County historically tilted Republican for much of the 20th century. However, it has swung heavily to the Democrats since the 1970s. It has supported the Democratic presidential candidate in all but one election since 1976, and is one of the most Democratic counties in Wisconsin.

Parks and recreation
The county has several parks, including Arena Pines-Sand Barrens State Natural Area, Pine Cliff State Natural Area, Blue Mound State Park, Tower Hill State Park, Black Hawk Lake Recreation Area and Governor Dodge State Park.

Communities

Cities
 Dodgeville
 Mineral Point

Villages

 Arena
 Avoca
 Barneveld
 Blanchardville (mostly in Lafayette County)
 Cobb
 Highland
 Hollandale
 Linden
 Livingston (mostly in Grant County)
 Montfort (mostly in Grant County)
 Muscoda (mostly in Grant County)
 Rewey
 Ridgeway

Towns

 Arena
 Brigham
 Clyde
 Dodgeville
 Eden
 Highland
 Linden
 Mifflin
 Mineral Point
 Moscow
 Pulaski
 Ridgeway
 Waldwick
 Wyoming

Census-designated place
 Edmund

Unincorporated communities

 Clyde
 Coon Rock
 Helena
 Hyde
 Jonesdale
 Middlebury
 Mifflin
 Moscow
 Pleasant Ridge
 Waldwick
 Wyoming

Ghost towns
 Adamsville
 Dirty Hollow
 Minersville
 Pendarvis

Notable people

 Gilbert L. Laws, Nebraska Secretary of State and US Congressman

See also
 National Register of Historic Places listings in Iowa County, Wisconsin
 Wisconsin State Natural Areas Program

References

Further reading
 Commemorative Biographical Record of the Counties of Rock, Green, Grant, Iowa, and Lafayette, Wisconsin, Containing Biographical Sketches of Prominent and Representative Citizens, and of Many of the Early Settled Families. Chicago: J.H. Beers and Co., 1901.
 Crawford, George and Robert M. Crawford (eds.). Memoirs of Iowa County, Wisconsin From the Earliest Historical Times Down to the Present. Northwestern Historical Association, 1913.
 History of Iowa County, Wisconsin. Chicago: Western Historical Company, 1881.

External links
 
 Iowa County government website
 Iowa County map from the Wisconsin Department of Transportation
 Iowa County Historical Society
 Iowa County Humane Society

 
1830 establishments in Michigan Territory
Populated places established in 1830
Madison, Wisconsin, metropolitan statistical area